Hard heart may refer to:

apathy (usually viewed negatively) 
stoicism (usually viewed positively)